This is an incomplete list of Los Angeles municipal election returns. In general, they are the semiofficial returns as provided to the public by the city clerk's office. The list does not include Board of Education races, municipal judgeships, boards of freeholders nor propositions, which can be found in the sources cited.

1884

Citywide, 1884–89

Mayor
Edward F. Spence (Republican) 2,073? (elected) / Cameron E. Thom (Democrat) 1,519? /  Hamilton (Greenback) 108? / Greene (People's) 86

City attorney
James Wilfred McKinley (Republican) 1,947 (elected) / H.K.S. O'Melveny (Democrat) 1,778 / Blanchard (People's) 96

Assessor, tax collector and  treasurer,

Common Council, 1884–86

lst
Yelsir (Democrat) 422 (elected) / Gherkins (Democrat) 305 / Hanly (People's) 24 / Cuyas (Independent) 24

2nd
Holbrook (Republican) 573 (elected) / Northcraft (Democrat) 476 (elected) / Bonebrake (Republican) 458 / and three others

3rd
Brown (Republican) 514 (elected) / Mesmer (Democrat) 384 / Palmer (People's) 38

4th
Milton Santee (Republican) 326 (elected) / James D. Bullis (Republican) 305 (elected) / Woodworth (Democrat) 243 / and two others

5th
Hiram Sinsabaugh (Republican) 268 (elected) / Rickenback (Democrat) 140 / McArthur (People's) 14

1885

Common Council, 1885–87
1st
G.L. Stearns 342 (elected) / J. Goss 336 (elected) / J. Baldwin 291 / and four others

2nd
J. Kuhrtz 576 (elected) / S. Rees 387

3rd
J. Bryson 384 (elected) / A.F. Mackay 369 (elected) / L.N. Breed 496 / and one other

4th
S.M. Perry, 300 (elected) / B. Cohn, 272

5th
Willard 266 (elected) / Frankenfeld 258 (elected) / Barrett 164 / and three others

1904

Citywide 1904-08

Mayor
Owen McAleer (Rep) 14,293 (elected) / Meredith Snyder (Dem) 10,949

City Clerk
Harry J. Lelande (Rep) 16,426 (elected) / Murphy (Dem) 7,544

Treasurer
Myers (Rep) 11,273 (elected) / Workman (Dem) 13,613

Auditor
Schwaebe (Rep) 13,409 (elected) / Plant (Dem) 7.907

Engineer
Stafford (Rep) 16,634 (elected) / Viole (Dem) 7,234

Street superintendent
Hanley (Dem) 17,461 (elected) / Werdin (Rep) 7.379

Assessor
Evan Lewis (Rep) 13,109 (elected) / Barham (Dem) 10,518

City attorney
Mathews (Rep) (unopposed and elected)

Tax and license collector
Johnson (Rep) (unopposed and elected)

City Council 1904–06

1st
Fred L. Ford (Rep) 1,220 (elected) / Nickel (Dem) 881

2nd
Vernon Hammon (Rep) 1,435 (elected) / Falconer (Dem) 1,126

3rd
Sidney W. Hiller (Rep) 1,520 (elected) / Foy (Dem) 991

4th
Theodore Summerland (Rep) 2,191 (elected) / Irvine (Dem) 1,841

5th
George A. Smith (Rep)1,598?  (elected) / No opponent

6th
Arthur D. Houghton (Ind) 2,143 (elected) / Scholl (Rep) 1,621 / Weber (Dem) 802

7th
Edward Kern (Dem) 1.821 (elected) / Fullway (Rep) 1,272

8th
Bernard Healy (Rep) 640 (elected) / Savage (Dem) 599

9th
Evert L. Blanchard (Rep) 1,301 (elected) / No opponent

City Council 1904–06

1st
Ford (Rep) 1,220 (elected) / Nickel (Dem) 881

2nd
Hammon (Rep) 1,435 (elected) / Falconer (Dem) 1,126

3rd
Hilier (Rep) 1,520 (elected) / Foy (Dem) 991

4th
Summerland (Rep) 2,191 (elected) / Irvine (Dem) 1,841

5th
Smith (Rep)1,598?  (elected) / No opponent

6th
Howton (Ind) 2,143 (elected) / Scholl (Rep) 1,621 / Weber (Dem) 802

7th
Kern (Dem) 1.821 (elected) / Fullway (Rep) 1,272

8th
Healy (Rep) 640 (elected) / Savage (Dem) 599

9th
Blanchard (Rep) 1,301 (elected) / No opponent

1909
December 8 election

Citywide 1909-11

Mayor
George Alexander 20,291 (elected) / George A. Smith 16,964

City Clerk
R.J. Lelande 30,305  (elected) / Louis C. Haller 5,712

City attorney
Leslie R. Hewitt 31,118 (elected) / George Edwards 4,688

Tax collector
Clarence M. Taggart 18,465 (elected / E.E. Johnson 17,241

Auditor
John S. Myers 21,724 (elected) / E.E, Bostwick, 14,064

City Council 1909-11 

All elected: John D. Works, 22,557; Martin F. Betkouski, 21,070; William J. Washburn, 20,761; Robert M. Lusk, 20,235; Josias J. Andrews, 20,020; Miles S. Gregory, 19,984; T.L. O'Brien, 19,195; George Williams, 18,933; Richmond Plant, 17,725.

All defeated: Henry H. Lyon, 17,044; Bernard Healy, 16,577; Charles J. Letts, 15,617; Henry H. Yonkin, 14,854; Robert E. Wirsching, 14,040; William E. McKee, 13,033; W.H. O'Connell, 12,841; Percy W. Ross, 12,778; Arthur D. Houghton, 12,078

1911

1911 primary

1911 final

First municipal election in which women voted.

Mayor George Alexander 85,492 (elected) / Job Harriman 51,423

City Attorney John W. Shenk 84,370 (elected) / Edward W. Tuttle 49,773

City Auditor John S. Meyers 83,842 (elected) /  George W. Downing 49,176

City Assessor Walter Mallard 83,102 (elected) / A.M. Salyer 50,119

Council members J.J. Andrews 82,834 (elected, 4 years) / M.F. Betkouski 83,076 (elected, 4 years / R.M. Lusk 82,958 (elected, 4 years) / F.C. Langdon 81,210 (elected, 4 years) / Charles McKenzie 79,323 (elected, 2 years) / H.W. Reed 78,107 (elected 2 years) / John Topham 73,540 (elected, 2 years) / F.J. Whiffen 78,383 (elected, 2 years) / George Williams 78,784 (elected, 2 years). Unelected runners-up not shown here; see source for details.

1915

1915 primary

1915 final

Mayor 
Charles Edward Sebastian 46,498 (elected) / Whiffen 41,989

City Council
Eight men and one woman were elected:  Fred C. Wheeler 57,232 / M.F. Betkouski 50,552 / J.S. Conwell 49,667 / F.C. Langdon 45,915 / Robert T. Brain 43,392 / Estelle Lawton Lindsey 41,437 / Foster C. Wright  37,029  / W.A. Roberts 36,536 / John Topham 31,339

1917

1917 primary

 One precinct did not report.

Mayor
Frederick T. Woodman (elected) / Meredith P. Snyder / Charles E. Sebastian

Auditor
John S. Myers (reelected) / C.H. Knapp / Louise Auerbach

City attorney
Albert Lee Stephens (reelected) / Warren L. Williams

City Council
Sixty-four men and four women  were in the May primary: Seventeen men and one woman were chosen for the final vote in June. They were Estelle Lawton Lindsey 19,214 / Fred C. Wheeler 18,024 / J.S Conwell 17,877 / Neal P. Olsen 16,776 / Walter Mallard 15,096 / Frederick C. Langdon 15,212 / Henry H. Lyon 14,452 / John B . Powell 12,845 / Foster C. Wright 13,085 / Ralph Luther Criswell 11,930 / Albert B. Conrad 11,755 / John B. Reeves 11,282 / Martin F. Betkouski 11,093 / W.A. Roberts 10,977 / O.P. Conway 10,991 / Frank L. Cleaveland 10,914 / A.D. Houghton 10,807 / Bert L. Farmer 10,458. Otto J. Zahn, with 7,417 votes, was a future City Council member who did not make the cut.

1917 final

City Council
Seventeen men and one woman were in the June final election. Nine men were elected. They were Walter Mallard 60,617 / Neal P. Olsen 60,009 / O.P. Conaway 50,863 / J.S. Conwell 49,980 / Albert B. Conrad 49,970 / Bert L. Farmer 49,075 / Frank L. Cleaveland 48,247 / Ralph Luther Criswell 45,356 / John B. Reeves 44,962. The runners-up were John B. Powell 42,709 / Henry H. Lyon 41,127 / A.D. Houghton 40,699 / Foster C. Wright 31,547 / Frederick C. Langdon 31,264 / Martin Betkouski 31,222 / Estelle Lawton Lindsey 28,891 / Fred C. Wheeler 28,487 / W.A. Roberts 27,270.

1919

1919 primary

Mayor
Meredith P. Snyder 23,368 (nominated) / Frederick T. Woodman 19,504 (nominated) / Weaver 13,864 / Williams 4,316 / Irene Smith 1,516 / Small 116

Auditor
John S. Myers 42,815 (reelected) 42,815 / Morehouse 10,288

City attorney
Burnell 21,791 (nominated) / James 11,511 (nominated) / Metcalf 10,163 / Burks 7,194 / Layng 1,887

City Council
The following eighteen people were nominated to run in the June election: Bert L. Farmer 31,114 / Boyle Workman 26,503 / Langdon 22,679 / Fred C. Wheeler 22,023 / (W.J.?) Sanborn 20,811 / Fleming 19,923 / Ralph Luther Criswell 19,068 / Mallard 18,295 / Cleaveland 16,326 / Conaway 16,210 / Braunton 16,001 / Seward 15,098 / Conrad 14,739 / Purcell 13,499 / Reeves 13,094 / Olsen 13,092 / True 12,886 / Houghton 11,406.

1919 final
  Incomplete returns.

Mayor
Meredith P. Snyder (elected) / Frederick T. Woodman

City attorney
Burnell (elected) / James

City Council
The following nine men were elected: Boyle Workman / Bert L. Farmer / Ralph Luther Criswell / Sanborn / Langdon / Fleming / Mallard / Wheeler / Conaway.

1921

1921 primary

Mayor
Meredith P. Snyder 33,378 (nominated) / George E. Cryer (nominated) 30,854 / Boyle Workman 12,982 /  William L. Smith 1,469 / Alfred A. Wright 512 / Hayden Morgan 325

Auditor
John S. Myers 40,301 (elected) / Chester C. Ashley 13,027 / B.E. Morehouse 9,082 / Michael Weisz 2,570

City attorney
Jess E. Stephens 61,619 (elected)

City Council
Walter Mullard 34,595 (nominated) / O.P. Conaway 29,653 (nominated) / Ralph L. Criswell 28,778 (nominated) / F.C. Langdon 28,113 (nominated) / F.C. Wheeler 27,801 (nominated) /  E.J. Delorey 25,123 (nominated) /  F.L. Cleaveland 24,576 (nominated) /  Benjamin Bogardus 22,485 (nominated) / W.J. Sanborn 22,197 (nominated) / W.C. Mushet 20,699 (nominated) /  Robert M. Allan 20,218 (nominated) /  A.B. Conrad 19,750 (nominated) /  F.H. True 18,930 (nominated) /  Ida W. Darling 18,946 (nominated) /  Robert Stewart Sparks 18,296 (nominated) /  Edward Roberts 12,312 (nominated) /  W.A. Roberts 11,210 (nominated) /  W.C. Steele 10,628 (nominated) / Frank Purcell 10,010 / Emma B. Swindell 9,526 / Henry A. Hart 9,495 /  J.M. Edwards 8,616 / George P. Mills 8,512 / Titus Alexander 8,487 / James Shackleford 7,993 / J.W. Toms 7,929 / Thomas M. Coughlin 7,548 / John B. Franklin 7,635 / Frank Blair 6,949 / Rosa Smith 6,407 / Harry Loomis 6,179 / Oscar C. Zahn 5,869 / C.M. O'Leary 5,742 / L..J. Wright 5,489 / Frank Shannon 5,423 / Cassius E. Bly 5,222 / W.H. Sanders 5,108 / J.L Seamans 4,471 / W.J. Thompson 4,182 / E.B. Harris 3,563 / J.E. Parish 3,187 / Irving A. Mandell 3,137 / Harry S. Fish 3,003 / Julius Levitt 2,787

1921 final

Mayor
George E. Cryer 37,510 (elected) / Meredith P. Snyder 33,411

City Council
Robert Stewart Sparks 27,215 (elected) / Ralph Luther Criswell 26,854 (elected) / Walter Mallard 26,374 (elected) / W.C. Mushet 24,690 (elected) / Winfred J. Sanborn 24,682 (elected) / F.C. Langdon 24,605 (elected) / Robert M. Allan 24,469 (elected) / O.P. Conaway 24,331 (elected) / F.C. Wheeler 23,975 (elected) / E.J. Delorey 23,334 / F.L. Cleaveland 22,875 / Benjamin Bogardus 22,452 / Ida Works Darling 21,306 / A.B. Conrad 20,024 / F.H True 19,285 / W.C. Steele 15,421 / Edward Roberts 14,353 / W.A. Roberts 14,247

1923

1923 primary

Mayor George E. Cryer 61,766 (reelected) / Bert L. Farmer 17,672 / Edward E. Moore 7,175 / Hancock 3,306 / Knapp 725

Auditor Myers 60,977 (elected) / Wright 16,061

City attorney Stephens 73,860 (elected)

City Council Criswell 11,583 (nominated) / Mallard 10,120 (nominated) / Allan 38,918 (nominated) / Sanborn 36,191 (nominated) / Mushet 35,137 (nominated) / Boyle Workman 34,526 (nominated) /  Robert Stewart Sparks 26,971 (nominated) /  Edwin Baker 26,615 (nominated) /  Miles S. Gregory 23,695 (nominated) / Wheeler 22,418 (nominated) / Charles J. Colden 24,217 (nominated) / Wardlaw 19,959 (nominated) / Wallace G. Oaks 165,659 (nominated) / Robert T. Brain 14,119 (nominated) / Isaac F. Hughes 12,698 (nominated) / Glen MacWilliams 12,327 (nominated) / C.W. Clegg 10,806 (nominated) / Irwin W. Camp 10,330 (nominated) /  A.L. Colby 9,883 / Marian Tracie Whiting 9,779 / Titus Alexander 9,637 / Eugene W. Brown 9,244 / Greely Kolts 8,660 / Fred Frank 8,648 / Coughlin 8,483? /  Wright 8,412? / William Edwards 8,280 / Charles H. Wood 7,466? / Bernard Goss 7,452 / James G. King 7,431? / Lewis E. Bishop 7,2?5 / Booker T. Washington Jr. 6,752 / William Charlton 6,522 / Charles G. Weickman 6,431 / George T. Jeffers 6,401 / Philip Jacobson 6,350 / Arthur V. Tyler 6,318 / Beaumont 5,746 / M.A. Shuster 5,642 /  James Brown 5,545 / C.B. Conlin 4,866 / L.C. Dodelan 3,918 / Harris 3,899 / George E. Killmer 3,683 / J.D. Huddle 2,482 / Anson B. Edgerly 2,158 / Edward C. Primus 1,934

1923 final

City Council

Robert M. Allan 50,909 (elected) / Boyle Workman 50,356 (elected) / Mallard 49,880 (elected) / Criswell 49,661 (elected) / Winfred J. Sanborn 45,745 (elected) / Mushet 40,898 (elected) / Gregory 37,089 (elected) / Wheeler 35,500 (elected) / Baker 34,942 (elected) / Charles J. Colden 34,670 / Robert Stewart Sparks 34,458 / Wardlaw 33,411 / Isaac F. Hughes 24,013 / Oaks 23,550 / Brain 21,331 / Clegg 17,313 / Camp 16,309 / MacWilliams 15,954

1925

1925 primary

Citywide 1925–29
Mayor
George E. Cryer 82,188 (reelected) / Benjamin F. Bledsoe 67,722 / Miles S. Gregory 9,540 / Edgar McKee 300 / E.J. Rindler 332 / Ralph L. Knapp 229

Controller
John S. Myers 64,049 (nominated) / W.C. Mushet 47,447 (nominated) / Arthur Eldridge 26,913

City attorney
Jess E. Stephens 129,461 (reelected)

City Council 1925–27
1st
Charles T. Wardlaw 3,106 (nominated) / Charles H. Randall 2,851 (nominated) / Edgar Lampton 1,593 / Arthur M.  Fellows 627 / Clara L. McDonald 328

2nd
Robert M. Allan 6,262 (reelected) / Harry D. Brown 3,179 / Milton L. Garrigus 1,426 / Victor M. Clark 1,070

3rd
Edwin O. Loucks 2,945 (nominated) / Isaac F. Hughes 2,729 (nominated) / Irwin W. Camp 1,373 / William La Plante 1,140 / Fred H. Leavitt 972 / Arthur O. Parker 883 / Arthur St. Claire Perry 735 / Frank Shannon 651 / H. Bernard Abbott 637 / William Vinson McCoy 510

4th
Boyle Workman 5,489 (reelected) / Henry Kraemer 2,817 / Charles D. Ray 2,275

5th
R.S. Sparks 3,282 (nominated) / John Topham 2,324 (nominated) / Willard E.  Badham 2,239 / Robert P. Sheldon 1,148 / Charles C. Weickman 898 / G.W. James 652 / W.H. Elliott 252 / Frederick G. Topp 63

6th
C.W. Clegg 3,555 (nominated) / Edward E. Moore, 3,061 (nominated) / Bert L. Farmer, 3,045 / B.A. Byrne 784  / Sarah Hawley 703 / H.J. Grimes 552 / Harry B. Lady 278 / Nathan Nagel 271 / E.A. Crandall 270 / Paul Lade 97

7th
Ralph Luther Criswell 3,436 (nominated) / Howard W. Davis 2,216 (nominated) / George F. Ryan 925 / S.B.W. May 657 / Edgard J. Nagle 467 / Eldon C. Rookledge 236

8th
Evan Lewis 1,445 (nominated) / Frank L. Shaw 1,383 (nominated); Greely Kolts 1,136 / George F. Gillett 1,100 / Harry F. Burke 1,014 / Bruce A. Nelson 731 / James M. Alexander 567 / Arne A. Nordskog 539 / W. F. Vellage  491 / Herbert J. Raymond 391 / George D. McClellan 358 / Edward R. Kerns 258 / James R. Gentry 211 / Benjamin S. Lauder 194 / David S. Reynolds 185

9th
Winfred J. Sanborn 4,578 (reelected) / Thomas L. Dodge 2,119 / Bruce M. John 751 / W.G. Browning 656 / Fred W. Kahlert 290 / W.S. Maharg 114

10th
Mark A. Pierce 2,302 (nominated) / Charles E. Downs 1,722 (nominated) / Joseph J. Meyers 1,394 / P.M. Abbott 1,131 / George A. Bell 712 / A.B. Jamison 236

11th
F.C. Langdon 2,172 (nominated) / Peirson M. Hall 1,636 (nominated) / George W. Rochester 912 / Frank H. Mouser 886 / Sidney W. Neighbors 573 / Marcus S. Casenave 468 / Alfred A. Wright 382 / Arch L. Mitchell 307

12th
A.J. Barnes 2,812 (nominated) / E.J. McCully 2,068 (nominated) / Clarence W. Horn 1,684 / Leslie R. Saunders 1,619 / J.L. Edwards 863 / Lin William Price 717 / Amos L. Colby 571 / W.H. Hartman 99

13th
Joseph L. Pedrotti 1,887 (nominated) / Joseph F. Fitzpatrick 1,510 (nominated) / Fred W. Fuller 1,476 / Carl Ingold Jacobson 1,459 / John E. Arnold 1,459 / Bearl Sprott 968 / Edward J. Kelly 677 / E. M. Stewart 505 / James C. Borton 464 / Thomas M. Coughlin 365

14th
Edwin Baker 4,526 (nominated) / I.C. Ash 4,374 (nominated) / Charles S. Lamb 1,091; W.A. Roberts 963 / Elsie G. Collins 651

15th
Charles J. Colden 4,324 (nominated) / James H. Dodson Jr. 2,501 (nominated) / Henry E. Carter 1,808 / E.M. Reimiller 1,173 / George I. Maxwell 269 / Charles B. Minter 191 / Edward Harris 70

1925 final

Citywide 1925–29

Controller
John S. Myers 67,537 (elected) / W.C. Mushet 38,651

City Council 1925–27

1st
Charles H. Randall 4,292 (elected) / Charles T. Wardlaw 3,719

2nd
Isaac F. Hughes 4,981 (elected) / Edwin O. Loucks 2,714

5th
R.S. Sparks 4,379 (elected) / John Topham 3,075

6th
Edward E. Moore 5,237 (elected) / C.W. Clegg 4,656

7th
Ralph Luther Criswell 3,477 (elected) / Howard W. Davis 2,482

8th
Frank L. Shaw 3,546 (elected) / Evan Lewis 2,616 / George F. Gillett 1,410

10th
Charles E. Downs 2,972 (elected) / Mark A. Pierce 2,726

11th
Peirson M. Hall 3,079 (elected) / Frederick C. Langdon 1,936

12th
A.J. Barnes 3,970 (elected) / E.J. McCully 3,016

13th
Joseph F. Fitzpatrick 3,722 (elected) / Carl Ingold Jacobson 3,710 / Joseph L. Pedrotti 2,405

14th
I.C. Ash 6,364 (elected) / Edwin Baker 4,202

15th
Charles J. Colden 4,750 (elected) / James H. Dodson Jr. 4,596

1927

1927 primary

City Council 1927–29

1st
Charles Randall 4,691 (elected) / John E. Lambert 2,596 / Frank W. Berkshire 1,676 / Clara McDonald 233

2nd
Arthur Alber 4,980 (elected) / Robert M. Allan 2,399 / J.F. Anderson 155

3rd
Ernest L. Webster 1,734 (nominated) / Isaac F. Hughes 2,089 (nominated) / John M. Pratt 805 / De Vier Ely 786 / J.C. Barthel 498 / Williams 432 / William Vinson McCoy 298 / E.W. McGill 175

4th
William M. Hughes 3,286 (elected) / Boyle Workman 2,883

5th
Virgil A. Martin 3,153 (nominated) / Robert Stewart Sparks 2,214 (nominated) / Charles D. Strickler 1,571 / John Topham 1,362 / Alma Nordstrom 475 / Tupper S. Malone 342

6th
Edward E. Moore 4,757 (nominated) / Lester R. Rice-Wray 2,642 (nominated) / Bert L. Farmer 2,579 / Thomas H. Hanna 1,421 / Bradford D. Bauens 243

7th
Howard W. Davis 3,305 (elected) / Ralph Luther Criswell 2,468 / George W. Grimmer 432 / A. Kreling 162

8th
Frank L. Shaw 3,785 (elected) / James R. Gentry 1,822 / William F. Vellage 400

9th
Winfred J. Sanborn 3,241 (elected) / M.T. Poling 1,706 / Jon Grand 427

10th
E. Snapper Ingram 1,298 (nominated) / John G. Todd 1,060 (nominated) / Otto J. Zahn 1,002 / George D. Hutchison 951 / Joseph J. Meyers 811 / P.M. Abbott 451 / J.A. Bristow 202

11th
Peirson M. Hall 2,874 (elected) / H.E. Binkley 1,009 / Frank H. Mouser 981

12th
Official recount: Douglas Eads Foster 3,628 (nominated) / Clarence W. Horn 1,921  (nominated) / A.J. Barnes 1,912 / R.M. Angier 219

13th
Carl Ingold Jacobson 4,585 (elected) / William M. Byrne 3,162 / William Rudolph 522 / James G. King 259 / Oscar W. Odell 138 / John E. Arnold 109 / Albert G. Sloan 107

14th
William G. Bonelli 5,760 (elected) / Harrie R. Collins 1,392 / Andrew S. Wilson 1,251 / A.H. Nickel 584 / Harold P. Fetter 566 / Karl F. Schweitzer 501 / Helga M. Qually 457 / Robert E. Parrott 199

15th
Charles J. Colden 5,661 (elected) / Reimiller 1,372 / Edwards 1,322 / Cox 646 / Maginnis 365 / Chais 212 / Anderson 164

1927 final

City Council 1927–29

3rd
Ernest L. Webster 9,608 (elected) / Isaac F. Hughes 2,386

5th
Virgil A. Martin 7,843 (elected) / Robert Stewart Sparks 2,889

6th
Lester R. Rice-Wray 8,327 (elected) / Edward E. Moore 4,757

10th
E. Snapper Ingram 3,746 (elected) / Todd 2,855

12th
Douglas Eads Foster 5,319 (elected) / Horn 3,012

1928

1928 recall

Three precincts missing.

For the recall of Council Member Lester R. Rice-Wray 10,168 (recalled) / against 5,872

In the election to succeed Rice-Wray: James G. McAllister 8,168 (elected) / Lester R. Rice-Wray 5,776 / Frank Jones 2,375

1929

1929 primary

Citywide 1929–33

Mayor
John C. Porter 75,198 (nominated / William G. Bonelli 45,200 (nominated) / John R. Quinn 39,425 / Perry H. Greer 22,022 / William La Plante 8,182 / Charles J. Colden 4,331 /  Carlin G. Smith 3,550 / Nicholas B. Harris 3,503 / Lloyd S. Nix 2,361 / Boyle Workman 2,057 / Charles Hopper 207 / Ralph L. Knapp 188 / Adam C. Derkum 179 / David Horsley 73

Controller
John S. Myers 129,251 (elected) / John R. Gaudin 28,729

City attorney
Erwin P. Werner 82,094 (nominated) / Peirson M. Hall (nominated) 61,226 / Donald M. Keith 33,698 / Leslie H. Kranz 4,794

City Council 1929–31

1st
Charles Randall 4,734 (nominated) / W.C. McColl 2, 247 (nominated) / Charles G. Young 1,346 / Truitt W. Hughes 1,025 / Estelle M. Holman 384

2nd
Thomas E. Cooke 7,486 (elected) / P.W. Croake / 1,814 / Milton H. Withers 1,314 / Robert D. Clarke 851 / Jesse McComas 656

3rd
Ernest L. Webster 7,800 (elected) / J. Walter Kays 3,875 / Albert J. Chotiner 2,037

4th
Robert L. Burns 4,312 (nominated) / William M. Hughes 3,313 (nominated) / Neal P. Olsen 1,752 / Willard G. Thorpe 1,560

5th
Virgil A. Martin 5,397 (nominated) / S. DeVier Ely 2,856 (nominated) / Joseph Oberwise 1,886 / Byron B. Brainard 1,623 / U.S.  Frye 818

6th
James G. McAllister 6,676 (elected) / John A. Westrom 1,980 / Charles K. Elliott 1,165 / George A. Lynch 744 / H.J. Grimes 575 / Thomas F. Franklin 554

7th Howard W. Davis 6,408 (elected) / E.J. Nagle 2,447 / Charles L. Ryan 1,285 / George W. Grimmer 1,022 / Willis W. Fuller 903

8th Evan Lewis 2,743 (nominated) / James Gentry 1,932 (nominated) / J.W. Toms 1,873 / Harold F. Marsden 1,786 / Harry F. Burke 1,784 / C.R. McFadden 888 / L.B. Bueter 537 / William T. Connor 391 / Peter Casserly 293 / Don Lake 179

9th
Winfred J. Sanborn 4,356 (nominated) / Frank Belcher (nominated) 2,655 / John Veith 1,520 / Lester M. Steele 1, 118 / John Grand 341

10th
E. Snapper Ingram 6,073 (elected) / George Underwood 3,045 / William J. Durm 1,304 / G.S. Mattern 573 / H.N. Witt, 356

11th
Lester R. Rice-Wray 3,054 (nominated) / J.C. Barthel 1,757 (nominated) / Edward A. Gerety Sr. 1,749 / Alfred A. Newton 1,482 / John T. Connelly 1,398 / Thomas F. Padden 1,277 / Nora O. Weaver 1,085 / Thomas H. Hanna 916 / Arthur Hirschhorn 675 / A.V. Dedrick 458

12th
Douglas Eads Foster 5,219 (nominated) / Thomas W. Williams 3,168 (nominated) / J. Stanley Farlinger 1,708 / Frank E. Fensch 1,535 / William N. Wenning 1,423 / William Francis Ireland 866

13th
Carl Ingold Jacobson 7,039 (elected) / Leslie R. Saunders 1,872 / Bearl Sprott 1,564 / Frederick W. Ferguson 815 / William B. Ferguson 624 / Walter L. La Pointe 602 / Wayne C. Stewart 276

14th
Charles A. Holland 5,326 (nominated) / Sherrill H. Osborne 2,687 (nominated) / Edward L. Thrasher 1,733 / Earl S. Parker 1,311 / James E. Long Sr. 1,182 / Lee R. Williams 1,064 / Ernest D. Snow 802 / Oscar Fifer 768 / J.E. Bambaugh 349 / Donald W. Spooner 257

15th
James E. Dodson Jr. 2,903 (nominated) / A.E. Henning 2,780 (nominated) / Frank McGinley 2,745 / C.F. Sampson 2,144 / Edward Kosin 500 / Wilmer E. Bromley 391 / Arthur L. Frazee 159

1929 final

Citywide 1929–1933

Mayor
John C. Porter 151,905 (elected) / William G. Bonelli 106,515

City attorney
Erwin P. Werner 152,566 (elected) / Peirson M. Hall 82,444

City Council 1929–1931

1st
Charles Randall 8,529 (elected) / McColl 7,375

4th
Robert L. Burns 7,763 (elected) / Hughes 6,599

5th
Virgil A. Martin 9.039 (elected) / Ely 7,490

8th
Evan Lewis 8,119 (elected) / Gentry 7,380

9th
Winfred J. Sanborn 7,396 (elected) / Belcher 5,550

11th
J.C. Barthel 11,410 (elected) / Lester R. Rice-Wray 6,637

12th
Thomas W. Williams 9,461 (elected) / Douglas Eads Foster 8,234

14th
Charles A. Holland 10,838 (elected) / Osborne 7,975

15th
A.E. Henning 8,666 (elected) / Dodson 7,500

1931

1931 primary

City Council 1931–33

1st
Charles Randall 5,856 (elected) / William C. McColl 3,732 / Frank W. Rice 888

2nd
Thomas F. Cooke 2,716 (nominated) / James M. Hyde 2,618 (nominated) / Henry G. Lyman 1,962 / Edward L. Davin 587

3rd
Ernest L. Webster 5,021 (nominated) / James Stuart McKnight 4,081 (nominated) / Abram C. Denman 2,028 / D.W. MacMillan 317

4th
Robert L. Burns 3,607 (nominated) / H.Z. Osborne 2,601 (nominated) / A.J. Spencer 659 / Leonard O. Hall 468 / A.E. Raessler 147

5th
Virgil A. Martin 2,954 (recount, nominated) / Roy Donley 1,766 (recount, nominated / Byron B. Brainard 1,745 (recount, failed) / Frank J. Waters 1,584 / Joseph Oberwise 977 / Robert Stewart Sparks 321 / Sidney A. Wilson 304 / Victor E. Breul 119

6th
James G. McAllister 4,540 (elected) / Charles L. Clark 2,141 / Claude R. Read 1,591 / Oliver K. Jones 243 / George I. Hughes 217

7th
Howard W. Davis 4,466 (elected) / Ralph L. Criswell 2,995 / Edward J. Nagle 908 / George Grant 462

8th
Evan Lewis 3,627 (nominated) / John S. Horn 1,713 (nominated) / James R. Gentry 1,480 / Ernest E. Debs 430 / Harry F. Burke 410 / L.B. Bueter 389 / Daniel J. O'Mara 227 / Thomas De Fabries 117

9th
Winfred J. Sanborn 3,044 (nominated) / George W.C. Baker 2,868 (nominated) / Frank Belcher 2,014 / William W. Busic 1,118 / John Vieth 814 / John W. Greenwood 332 / Sam Shulem 191

10th
E. Snapper Ingram 3,336 (nominated) / George Underwood 2,598 (nominated) / George A. Pendleton 1,745 / George A. Bell 545 / Joseph F. Curran 438

11th
J.C. Barthel 1,958 (nominated) / Clarence E. Coe 1,535 (nominated) / Louis L. Goodman 1,456 / Charles H. Treat 1,126 / Edward J. Morgan 1,010 / Thomas F. Padden 839 / Edward A. Gerety Sr.  723/ Arthur Johnson 587 / John B. Young 539 / Glen Ingles 483 / Sidney A. Cherniss 378 / Stanley Sayer 362 / Philip Baldwin 124 / Lester R. Rice-Wray 120 / T.S. Aisbitt 55

12th
Thomas Francis Ford 4,236 (nominated) / Douglas Eads Foster 3,136 (nominated) / Miles S. Gregory 2,424 / Lyndon R. Foster 379 /  Daniel Ballmer 293

13th
Carl Ingold Jacobson 3,802 (nominated) / Henry E. Holbrook 1,141 (nominated) / A. Judson Samis 978 / Joseph Napolitano 972 / Leslie R. Saunders 827 / H.J. O'Neill 658 / Claude C. Brooks 612 / Roy Hampton 555 / Andrew G. Vaughn 164 / Joseph Despart 142 / Florence E. Gilmour 73

14th
Charles A. Holland 4,903 (nominated) / Edward L. Thrasher 2,654 (nominated) / Thomas L. Doherty 1,938 / A.E. Nelson 1,075 / W.K. Dowan 1,091 /  Joseph Reece 602 / Emmett L. Pickerel 45

15th
A.E. Henning 5,604 (nominated) / Frank McGinley 5,490 (nominated) / Alick W. Anderson 444 / Fred C. Hermann 254

1931 final

City Council 1931–33

2nd
James M. Hyde 5,258 (elected) / Thomas F. Cooke 4,861

3rd
James Stuart McKnight 7,866 (elected) / Ernest L. Webster 6,687

4th
Robert L. Burns 5,399 (elected) / Henry Z. Osborne 5,093

5th
Roy L. Donley 5,671 (elected) / Virgil A. Martin 5,510

8th
Evan Lewis 7,241 (elected) / John S. Horn 3,701

9th
George W.C. Baker (elected) 6,881 / Winfred J. Sanborn 6,019

10th
E. Snapper Ingram 5,807 (elected) / George Underwood 4,891

11th
Clarence E. Coe 5,460 (elected) / Charles W. Dempster 4,444 / J.C. Barthel 3,621

12th
Thomas Francis Ford 8,315 (elected) / Douglas E.  Foster 5,882

13th
Carl Ingold Jacobson 6,424 (elected) / Henry E. Holbrook 5,070

14th
Edward L. Thrasher 7,569 (elected) / Charles A. Holland 7,009

15th
A.E. Henning 9,611 (elected) / Frank McGinley 8,213

1933

1933 primary

Citywide 1933–37

Mayor
Frank L. Shaw 118,775 (nominated) / John C. Porter (nominated) 111.540 / George E. Cryer 36,193 / Charles W. Dempster 35,285 / Charles S. Hutson 10,639 / Frank C. Shoemaker 5,339 / Chaim Shapiro 4,702 / Martin C. Neuner 3,511 / George H. McLain 2,354 / Lawrence Ross 2,311

Controller
John S. Myers 169,561 (elected) / James C. Quinn 95,702

City attorney
Ray L. Chesbro 155,335 (elected) / Erwin P. Werner 140,827

City Council 1933-35

1st
Jim Wilson 4,958 (nominated) / Charles H. Randall (nominated) 4,889 / Mark C. Sutton 3,653 / Sterling Martin 1,661 / George C. Audet 1,074 / Ray A. Schafer 950 / George Mozee 835 / George E. Menner 728 / Harry E. Beatty 485

2nd
James M. Hyde 5,629 (nominated) / Leon N. Raab 3,922 (nominated) / William C. Harvey 2,886 / Harry B. Leonard 2,263 / E.D. Horkheimer 1,101

3rd
Stephen W. Cunningham 7,016 (nominated) / James S. McKnight 2,884 (nominated) / R.L. Joyner 2,028 / Albert Jack Chotiner 1,572 / Robert Bonner 1,120 / Paul V. Parker 900 / George A. Heap 893 / Harry W. Boles 830 / Vance Evans 403

4th
Robert L. Burns 8,446 (elected) / H.Z. Osborne 5,068 / P.F. Jordan 1,417 / Julius Krieger 1,162

5th
Roy L. Donley 8,618 (nominated) / Byron B. Brainard 6,090 / Virgil A. Martin 4,305

6th
James G. McAllister 8,528 (nominated) / Earl C. Gay 3,820 (nominated) / Lee D. Matthews 2,960 / Harry E. Defty 2,724 / J. Earl Scott 1,371 / Charles Hopper 1,084

7th
Howard W. Davis 9,361 (elected) / Bert L. Farmer 3,386 / Alex Salot 1,417 / C.C. Terzo 1,061

8th
Evan Lewis 7,074 (nominated) / James R. Gentry 5,322 (nominated) / Jacob Massion 4,438 / Ezra W. Chase 516

9th
George W.C. Baker 11,855 (elected) / Winfred J. Sanborn 4,122 / H.A. Weiner 2,715 / James Scofield 1,663

10th
E. Snapper Ingram 7,886 (elected) / Thomas D. Long 6,423

11th
Clarence E. Coe 4,711 (nominated) / Charles Winchester Breedlove 1,884 (nominated) / Arthur Johnson 1,718 / L.l. Goodman 1,510 / Ted E. Felt 1,221 / G.N. Kirkman 1,183 / G.C. Baker 995 / J.G. Levenson 926 / J.C. Barthel 570

12th, unexpired term of Council Member Thomas Francis Ford
James T. Carroll 8,224 (elected) / George W. Scott 6,651

12th, full term
John W. Baumgartner 9,253 (nominated) / Charles A. McNeill 5,356 (nominated) / Miles S. Gregory 3,988

13th
Darwin W. Tate 6,081 (nominated) / Carl Ingold Jacobson 5,624 (nominated) / James E. Keogh 2,659 / R.V. McClain 860 / Henry Reichard 427

14th
Edward L. Thrasher 8,624 (nominated) / L. Roy Williams 6,116 (nominated) / Thomas L. Doherty 3,461 / William Authorson 827

15th
A.E. Henning 5,905 (nominated) / Franklin P. Buyer 3,481 (nominated) / F.O. Adler 3,348 / N.A. Smith 1,351 / Gus H. Homer 855 / Irvin G. Lewis 828 / George H. Nixon 761

1933 final

Citywide 1933–37

Mayor
Frank L. Shaw 187,053 (elected) / John C. Porter 155,513

City Council 1933-35

1st
Jim Wilson 15,693 (elected) / Charles Randall 8,375

2nd
James M. Hyde 10,474 (elected) / Leon N. Raab 9,813

3rd
Stephen W. Cunningham 15,698 (elected) / James Stuart McKnight 5,582

5th
Byron B. Brainard 13,163 (elected) / Roy Donley 10,499

6th
Earl C. Gay 12,131 (elected) / James G. McAllister 11,856

8th
Evan Lewis 12,953 (elected) / James R. Gentry 12,129

11th
Charles Winchester Breedlove 11,275 (elected) / Clarence E. Coe 9,082

12th
John W. Baumgartner 13,894 (elected) / C.A. McNeill 9,343

13th
Darwin William Tate 14,043 (elected) / Carl Ingold Jacobson 7,823

14th
Edward L. Thrasher 14,675 (elected) / L.R. Williams 9,997

15th
Franklin P. Buyer 11,354 (elected) / A.E. Henning 10,290

1935

1935 primary

City Council 1935-37
EPIC after a name indicates endorsement by End Poverty in California

1st
Jim Wilson 7,940 (nominated) / Barclay W. Bradley (EPIC) 6,533 (nominated) / John H. Fritz 1,782 / Donald W. Moore 1,144 / George Salisbury 382

2nd
James M. Hyde (EPIC) 6,346 (nominated) / Edmund R. Bohan 6,346 (nominated) / William D. Neil 2,443 / Frank H. Greer 946 / James Quinn 927 / Carleton Bainbridge 510

3rd
Stephen W. Cunningham 10,701 (elected) / James M. Carter (EPIC) 4,687

4th
Robert L. Burns 9,056 (elected) / G. Howard Fenton 2,375 / Roy Wheeler (EPIC write-in) 1,478

5th
Byron B. Brainard 8,687 (nominated) / Charles W. Dempster (EPIC) 6,590 (nominated) / Dan Crowley 846 / Martin B. Kugler 722 / Eleanor Savay 665

6th
Earl C. Gay 8,256 (nominated) / Lottie Barkow (EPIC) 3,706 (nominated) / Andrae B. Nordskog 1,497 / Louis E. Ottie 1,320 / L.E. Orr 990 / Charles N. Rapfogel 916 / Harry E. Defty 688 / Douglas J. Hamilton 618 / Charlie Hopper 401 / Charles E. Fergason 394

7th
Will H. Kindig (EPIC) 5,514 (nominated) / Dwight Baker 3,927 (nominated) / Homer Crutchfield 2,674 / Horace A. Wilson 1,336 / John J. Marstellar 364

8th
Evan Lewis 7,438 (nominated) / Arthur P. Moran (EPIC) 4,119 (nominated) / Jack Massion 3,313 / Leo S. Tilley 2,234 / Earl Heller 705

9th
Parley Parker Christensen (EPIC) 5,542 (nominated) / George W.C. Baker 5,437 (nominated) / Winfred J. Sanborn 2,071 / Jack Y. Berman 1,909 / William L. Cummings 1,607 / Karlton I. Pidgeon 1,031 / Howard E. Dorsey 689 / R.E. Lucatoria 666 /

10th
G. Vernon Bennett (EPIC) 5,974 (nominated) / E. Snapper Ingram 5,810 (nominated) / Karl F. Euper 899 / Allan M. Rose 703 / Austin L. Tournoux 387 / Lenna G. Walradt 371

11th Unexpired term of Charles Winchester Breedlove
Robert S. MacAlister 6,190 (elected) / Arthur Johnson 2,193 / Charles W. Hooper 1,902 / Jack J. Casson 1,186

11th Full term
Robert S. MacAlister 4,267 (nominated) / Howard B. Rose (EPIC) 3,961 (nominated) / J.W. O'Connor 1,426 / Charles W. Hooper 1,401 / Arthur Johnson 1,312 / Louis L. Goodman 1,143 / Alfred Watterson 896 / Jack J. Casson 472 / Edward W. McGill 464 / David MacFarlane 362 / H. Clarke Trigg 344 / Fred W. Bentine 118

12th
John W. Baumgartner (EPIC) 10,676 (elected) / Charles A. McNeill 5,823 / Harry Lee Jones (write-in) 213

13th
Darwin William Tate 9,164 (elected) / Rube Borough (EPIC) 5,429 / James E. Moore 1,182 / Sam D. Barry 522 / Clarence H. Bright 506 / Walter R. Mozee 251

14th
Edward L. Thrasher 7,889 (nominated) / Royal M. Davis (EPIC) 3,343 (nominated) / L. Roy Williams 3,039 / Harold P. Fetter 1,855 / Lewis C. Martyn 898 / Frank J.  Rogers 883 / Harmond B. Amacker 828 / Robert E. Rose 769

15th
Edwin G. Gettins (EPIC) 5,629 (nominated) 5,629 / Franklin P. Buyer 5,407 (nominated) / Royal S. Riddle 2,073 / Frederick O. Adler 1,882 / John T. Rawls 1,422

1935 final

City Council 1935-37

1st
Jim Wilson 11,109 (elected) / Bradley W. Barclay 8,952

2nd
James M. Hyde 7,652 (elected) / Edmund R. Bohan 7,234

5th
Byron B. Brainard 11,260 (elected) / Charles W. Dempster 8,585

6th
Earl C. Gay 12.244 (elected) / Lottie E. Barkow (EPIC)  6,955

7th
Will H. Kindig 8.077 (elected) / Dwight Baker 7,597

8th
Evan Lewis 10,395 (elected) / Arthur P. Moran 8,964

9th
Parley Parker Christensen 11,114 (elected) / George W.C. Baker 9,695

10th
G. Vernon Bennett 8,794 (elected) / E. Snapper Ingram 8,064

11th
R.S. MacAlister 9,499 (elected) / Howard B. Rose 7,515

14th
Edward L. Thrasher 12,921 (elected) / Royal M. Davis 7,439

15th
Franklin P. Buyer 9,051 / Edwin G. Gettins 8,392

1937

1937 primary

Citywide 1937-41

Mayor
Frank L. Shaw 104,481 (nominated) / Ford 77,703 (nominated) / McDonough 40,526 / Wirsching 15,764 / Nordskog 4,833 / Shoemaker 2,142

Controller
Hoye 134,713 (elected) / Collins 41,367 / Cox 22,500

City Attorney
Chesebro (elected) 116,647 / Taplin 76,912 / Cryer 19,205 / Hubbard 8,501 / Moidel 4,885

City Council 1937-39

1st
Jim Wilson 8,948 (elected) / Robinson 2,769 / Quesinberry 2,489

2nd
Norris J. Nelson 4,603 (nominated) / James M. Hyde 4,227  (nominated) / Quinn 1,354 / Alberti 1,353 / Quigley 660

3rd
Stephen W. Cunningham 8,043 (elected) / Burke 2,350

4th
Robert L. Burns 8,333 (elected)

5th
Byron B. Brainard 9,683 (elected) / Roy Donley 3,591 / Merrill 1,971

6th
Earl C. Gay 10,284 (elected) / Crahan 1,287 / Deegan 1,569

7th
Howard W. Davis 8,010 (elected) / Will H. Kindig 6,705

8th
Evan Lewis 7,913 (elected) / Massion 2,646 / Crosswhite 1,175 / Rees 1,004 / Smith 606 / Quinn 184

9th
Howard E. Dorsey 4,017 (nominated) / Jack Y. Berman 2,450 (nominated) / Armstrong 2,295 / Bowman 2,110 / Winfred J. Sanborn 1,989 / Peterson 1,952 / Farrow 1,081 / Pritchard 730 / Briggs 661 / Wainess 592 / Sheinart 241 / Koehler 131

10th
G. Vernon Bennett 8,065 (elected) / McLain 5,306

11th
R.S. MacAlister 7,849 (elected) / Voigt 3,742 / J.C. Barthel 1,319

12th
John W. Baumgartner 9,679 (elected)

13th
Darwin William Tate 10,085 (elected) / Johnson 4,812

14th
Edward L. Thrasher 10,406 (elected) / Rose 7,113

15th
Franklin P. Buyer 7,511 (elected) / Draper 4,337 / Nixon 1,460 / Gallagher 901 / Fisher 692

1937 final

Citywide 1937-41

Mayor
Frank L. Shaw 169,848 (elected) / John Anson Ford 144,079

City Council 1937-39

2nd
James M. Hyde 9,161 (elected) / Norris J. Nelson 8,981

9th
Howard E. Dorsey 12,636 / Jack Y. Berman 10,651

1938

1938 recall

Citywide 1938–40

Mayor In favor of the recall of Frank L. Shaw 236,525 (approved) / Opposed 129,245

For mayor Fletcher Bowron 233,427 (elected) / Frank L. Shaw 122,692 / Alonzo Jehiel Riggs 4,050 / Albert F. Osterloh 2,706

City  Council 1938–39

6th In favor of the recall of Earl C. Gay 10,009 / Opposed 14,336 (defeated)

1939

1939 primary

City Council 1939–41

1st
Jim Wilson 8,446 (nominated) / Delamere Francis McCloskey 4,249 (nominated / Everett G. Burkhalter 3,904 / C. Oscar Leach 1,473

2nd
Norris J. Nelson 9,632 (elected) / James M. Hyde 4,287

3rd
Stephen W. Cunningham 6,794 (elected)

4th
Robert L. Burns 7,356 (elected) / Harry H. Ferrell 2,707

5th
Byron B. Brainard 6,815 (nominated) / Arthur E. Briggs 5,715 (nominated) / Ralph S.  Armour 1,799 / Ed J. Ryman 332 / Fred Chapman 282

6th
Earl C. Gay 7,132 (nominated) / Chelene V. Eckerson 4,749 (nominated) / Doyle D. McClurg 1,078 / Tom Howard 931 / Dan C. Egan 698 / Orvin A. Koch 577 / Harry E. Defty 493

7th
Leon H. Washington Jr.  5,011 (nominated) / Carl C. Rasmussen 3,402 (nominated) / Howard W. Davis 3,049 / M.T. Faulkes 1,756 / Ray West 1,242 / Edward J. Nagle 974 / Scott Weller 604 / John R. Edwards 507 / Everett K. Miller 291 / Jay W. Swander 161

8th
Evan Lewis 7,864 (elected) / Andrew C. Pereboom 2,168 / Robert Hyde 1,630 / Gene Flint 1,278

9th (unexpired term of Howard E. Dorsey)
Winfred J. Sanborn 6,548 (nominated) / Parley Parker Christensen 5,404 (nominated) / George W.C. Baker 2,007 / Waldo D. Rios 1,797

9th (full term)
Winfred J. Sanborn 5,023 (nominated) / Parley Parker Christensen 3,886 (nominated) / Jack Y. Berman 3,088 / Harry J. Raymond 2,130 / John B. Pelletier 2,074 / George W.C. Baker 1,511 / Waldo D. Rios 1,200

10th
G. Vernon Bennett 9,526 (elected) / Willard E. Badham 2,192 / Solly F. Smith 1,620 / Allan M. Rose 804

11th
Robert S. MacAlister 5,489 (nominated) / Harold Harby 4,593 (nominated) / Edgar C. Steeves 2,618 / Ted E. Felt 688 / J.C. Barthel 402

12th
John W. Baumgartner 6,262 (nominated) / Samuel W. Yorty 4,729 (nominated) / Ralph H. Gray 4,684

13th
Frank Merrill 3,292 (nominated) / Roy Hampton 3,215 (nominated) / Grover C. Johnson 3,000 / Carl Ingold Jacobson 2,483 / David P. Vienna 2,122 / Mildred Gilmore 1,050 / H. Raymond  Campbell 614 / Harry W. Francis 439

14th
Edward L. Thrasher 8,650 (elected) / George Knox Roth 5,633 / Charles A. Self 1,042 / John J. Reltano 825 / Harry Clay Swift 646 / James N. Rankin 442

15th
Franklin P. Buyer 4,726 (nominated) / Wilder W. Hartley 3,074 (nominated) / Fred Reaves 2,567 / Ben Wood 998 / Clarence E. Harrison 758 / Leonard R. Davison 684 / W.A. Gallagher 546 / Benjamin M. Bendat 506 / William H. Wilson 498 / Edward Kosin 428 / J.C. Holland 289

1939 final

City Council 1939–41

1st
Jim Wilson 11,786 (elected) / Delamere F. McCloskey 11,574

5th
Arthur E. Briggs 11,276 (elected) / Byron B. Brainard 9,281

6th
Earl C. Gay 11,867 (elected) / Chelene V. Eckerson 11,386

7th
Carl C. Rasmussen 13,928 (elected) / Leon H. Washington Jr. 9,575

9th (unexpired term of Howard E. Dorsey)
Parley P. Christensen 11,450 (elected) / Winfred J. Sanborn 10,471

9th (full term)
Parley P. Christensen 12,168 (elected) / Winfred J. Sanborn 10,783

11th
Harold Harby 11,151 (elected) / Robert S. MacAlister 8,651

12th
John W. Baumgartner 10,508 (elected) / Samuel W. Yorty 9,766 / R.H. Gray 393

13th
Roy Hampton 11,830 (elected) / Frank Merrill 9,243

15th
Wilder W. Hartley 11,973 (elected) / Franklin P. Buyer 8,461

1941

1941 primary

Some are incomplete.

Citywide 1941–45

Mayor
Fletcher Bowron 146,006 (nominated) / Stephen W. Cunningham (nominated) 57,009 / Kramer 30,067 / Porter 28,605 / Shaw 24,101 / Husband 9,198 / Rossitto 1,964 / Thayer 1,433

City attorney
Chesebro 199,922 (elected) / Allen 51,676 / Maine 11,628

Controller
Hoye 138,992 (elected) / Cassidy 73,053 / Abbott 41,061

City Council 1941–43

1st
Jim Wilson 9,264 (nominated) / Delamere F. McCloskey (nominated) 5,156 / Charles E. Cook Jr. 4,969 / Kingdon H. Hicks 828 / Charles L. Davies 766 / Frank Di Cristina 628

2nd
Norris J. Nelson 10,119 (elected) / Taylor 3,667

3rd
Paul V. Parker 6,136 (nominated) / J. Win Austin 5,360 (nominated) / Burke 2,329 / Litzenberg 681 / Offutt 603

4th
Robert L. Burns 12,061 (elected) / Melham 2,282

5th
Arthur E. Briggs 7,313 (nominated) / Ira J. McDonald 6,242 (nominated) / Raymond 3,049 / Merrill 1,741 / Witman 610

6th
Earl C. Gay 11,238 (elected) / Eckerson 8,186

7th
Carl C. Rasmussen 8,123 (nominated) / Howard W. Davis 5,928 (nominated) / Ferry 1,238 / Motter 1,003

8th
Charles A. Allen 6,417 (nominated) / Massion 6,200 (nominated) / Rees 2,260 / Crosswhite 1,317

9th
Parley Parker Christensen 8,718 (nominated) / Waxman 4,817 (nominated) / Mathews 2,672 / Fife 1,488

10th
G. Vernon Bennett 8,287 (elected) / Smith 3,806 / Van  Dame 1,071

11th
Harold Harby 8,722 (elected) / Shimp 2,332 / Baldwin 1,854 / Appleton 1,635

12th
John W. Baumgartner 9,990 (elected) / Gray 4,926 / Honeycombe 1,179 / Kushner 1,028

13th
Roy Hampton 11,182 (elected) / Borough 5,428 / Jacobson 3,176

14th
Edward L. Thrasher 9,987 (nominated) / Roth 6,977 (nominated) / Hamilton 1,789 / Higgins 1,682

15th
Wilder W. Hartley 7,637 (nominated) / Franklin P. Buyer 7,096 (nominated) / Jett 1,298 / MacDonald 1,574

1941 final

1941-45 citywide

Mayor
Fletcher Bowron 181,582 (elected) /  Stephen W. Cunningham 149,195

1941–43 City Council

1st
Delamere Francis McCloskey 12,826 (elected) / Jim Wilson 12,148

3rd
J. Win Austin 10,446 (elected) / Paul V. Parker 8,649

5th
Ira J. McDonald 12,420 (elected) / Arthur E. Briggs 9,492

7th
Carl C. Rasmussen 11,726 (elected) / Howard W. Davis 8,340

8th
Charles A. Allen 12,031 (elected) / Massion 8,408

9th
Parley Parker Christensen 12,838 (elected) / Waxman 7,644

14th
Edward L. Thrasher 12,623 (elected) / Roth 11,386

15th
Wilder W. Hartley 11,877 (elected) / Franklin P. Buyer 7,917

1943

1943 primary

1943–45 City Council

1st
Delamere Francis McCloskey 6,524 (elected) / Scherer 2,948 / Gettys 1,532 / Dentzel 725 / West 622 / Delph 483

2nd
Lloyd G. Davies 6,243 (elected) / Gordon 1,580 / Wright 928 / Cuthbertson 885 / Nelson 639 / Taylor 522

3rd
J. Win Austin 7,587 (elected) / Parker 575

4th
Robert L. Burns 10,141 (elected) / Gunn 928

5th
Ira J. McDonald 6,771 (elected) / MacDonough 3,342 / Arthur E. Briggs 2,334

6th
Earl C. Gay 5,783 (nominated) / L.E. Timberlake 4,136 (nominated) / McGahan 2,287 / McFarland 652

7th
Carl C. Rasmussen 7,226 (elected) / Collins 2,941

8th
Charles A. Allen 6,825 (elected)

9th
Parley Parker Christensen 5,900 (nominated) / Allen 3,876 (nominated) / Campbell 1,727 / Forbes 1,113

10th
G. Vernon Bennett 5,510 (elected) / Kilpatrick 3,718 / Barnard 1,573

11th unexpired term
Dave Stannard 5,098 (elected) / Harold Harby 4,420

11th full term
Harold Harby 4,020 (nominated) / Dave Stannard 3,998 (nominated) / Blake 2,135 / Lindstrom 465

12th
John W. Baumgartner 8,068 (elected) / Tierney 1,516 / Gill 1,323 / Kushner 636 / Gore 523

13th
Roy Hampton 6,363 (nominated) / Ned R. Healy 3,328 / Kay Cunningham 3,310 / Meade McClanahan 1,266

14th
John C. Holland 8,916 (elected) / Edward L. Thrasher 5,758 / Shield 800

15th
George H. Moore 6,383 (elected) / Wilder W. Hartley 4,664

1943 final

1943–45 City Council

6th
Earl C. Gay 8,841 (elected) / L.E. Timberlake 8,404

9th
Parley Parker Christensen 7,309? (elected) / Allen 7,026

11th
Harold Harby 6,392 (elected) / Dave Stannard 5,988

13th
Ned R. Healy 9,177 (elected) / Roy Hampton 7,613

1945

1945 primary

1945–49 Citywide

Mayor
Fletcher Bowron 146,707 (elected) / Clifford Clinton 51,226 / Roger Jessup 34,056 / Ira J. McDonald 12,721 / Samuel W. Yorty 10,407 / Entenza 10,319 / Jones 2,341 / Gunn 1,274 / Dyster 790 / Hill 647 / Weiss 581 / Zeman 512 / Martin 368 / Mosteller 233

City attorney
Chesebro 197,957 (elected) / Friday 30,902

1945–47 City Council

1st
Delamere Francis McCloskey 6,570 (nominated) / Leland S. Warburton 6,222 (nominated) / Randall 1,391 / Ellis 1,088

2nd
Lloyd G. Davies 10,153 (elected) / Fulton 2,867 / Crowe 1,444 / Wright 1,332 / LaGuardia 585

3rd
Figures missing.

4th
Harold A. Henry 8,622 (nominated) / Groman 3,398 (nominated) / E. Snapper Ingram 2,238 / Hensley 1,077 / Hayden 648 / Syracuse 579 / Hansen 568 / Melham 345

5th
George P. Cronk 4,972 (nominated) / Kennedy 4,555 (nominated) / Olson 2,909 / Murchison 1,032 / Northrup 910? / Brooks 766 / Smith 551 / Wood 419

6th
Earl C. Gay 7,866 (nominated) / L.E. Timberlake 6,473 (nominated) / Williams 2,249 / Read 777

7th
Carl C. Rasmussen 9,319 (nominated) / Charlotta A. Bass 6,546 (nominated) / Hawkins 1,369 / Ferry 1,001 / Branch 693

8th
Charles A. Allen 8,852 (elected) / Gentry 4,009 / Hillton 741 / Rose 685

9th
Parley Parker Christensen 7,378 (nominated) / Allen 5,122 / Quevedo 2,227 / Campbell 2,010 / Rose 1,038

10th
G. Vernon Bennett 12,207 (elected) / Biber 2,327

11th
Harold Harby 9,633 (elected) / Dave Stannard 2,263 / MacGregor 1,685

12th
Ed J. Davenport 4,301 (nominated) / Newton 3,642 (nominated) / Brown 2,034 / Merrill 1,980 / Campbell 1,879 / McFarland 1,171 / Tierney 906 / Kushner 874 / Pettis 216

13th full term
Meade McClanahan 9,098 (elected) / Joseph W. Aldlin 7,328 / Brankey 1,642

13th unexpired term
Meade McClanahan 9,505 (elected) / Joseph W. Aldlin 7,277

14th
John C. Holland 12,846 (elected) / Laster 5,817

15th
George H. Moore 8,168 (elected) / Wilder W. Hartley 4,305

1945 final

1945–47 City Council
Incomplete

1st
Leland S. Warburton 7,271 (elected) / Delamere Francis McCloskey 4,598

4th
Harold A. Henry 11,112 (elected) / Groman 3,848

5th
George P. Cronk, 9,347 (elected) / Kennedy 6,195

6th
L.E. Timberlake 9,295 (elected) / Earl C. Gay 9,185

7th
Carl C. Rasmussen 14,593 (elected) /  Charlotta A. Bass 7,748

9th
Parley Parker Christensen 8,848 (elected) / Allen 8,261

12th
Ed J. Davenport 7,809 (elected) / Newton 7,584

1946

1946 recall election

1946–47 City Council

13th recall Meade McClanahan

Yes 12,394 approved / No 8,913

13th
John R. Roden 11,394 (elected) / Hubert Wallis 1,028 / John P. McGinley 929

1947

1947 primary

1947–49 City Council

1st
Leland S. Warburton 16,703 (elected) / LaRue 2,681

2nd
Lloyd G. Davies 14,462 (elected) / McKnight 4,063 / Brubaker 2,580 / Lusk 982 / Joel 415

3rd
J. Win Austin 14,613 (elected) / McMillan 5,078

4th
Harold A. Henry 12,959 (elected) / Doran 5,107 / Butler 1,153 / Chiverton 611

5th
George P. Cronk 16, 223 (elected) / Gans 2,371

6th
L.E. Timberlake 10,878 (elected) / Brown 3,559 / Earl C. Gay 3,223 / Corrigan 1,525 / Williams 461 / Beets 319

7th
Carl C. Rasmussen 7,278 (nominated) / Don A. Allen 5,691 (nominated) / Caston 5,502 / Davis 2,643 / Collins 1,104 / Townsend 908 / Draper 286 / Alvord 200

8th
Charles A. Allen 8,841 (nominated) / Kenneth Hahn 5,702 (nominated) / Caukins 1,761 / Monjar 1,338

9th
Parley Parker Christensen 8,933 (nominated) / Sheehan 3,778 (nominated) / Edward R. Roybal 3,338 / Jaffe 3,098 / Shalmo 1,225

10th
G. Vernon Bennett 12,464 (elected) / Downs 2,861 / Bratton 1,876

11th
Harold Harby 13,955 (elected) / Kelleher 3,568

12th
Ed J. Davenport 13,555 (elected) / Behrend 4,436 / Maxwell 1,225 / Gibbons 972

13th
Ernest E. Debs 10,216 (nominated) / John R. Roden 10,046 (nominated) / Meade McClanahan 2,783 / Willingham 1,454

14th
John C. Holland 11,602 (elected) / Mitchell 4,373 / Bishop 2,528 / Baker 2,356 / Buckley 841

15th
George H. Moore 8,318 (nominated) / Wilder W. Hartley 5,041 (nominated) / DeHoog 3,852 / Kisner 728

1947 final

1947–49 City Council

7th
Don A. Allen 14,542 (elected) / Carl C. Rasmussen 9,408

8th
Kenneth Hahn 11,938 (elected / Charles A. Allen 9,235

9th
Parley Parker Christensen 11,233 (reelected) / Sheehan 9,540

13th
Ernest E. Debs 15,932 (elected) / John R. Roden 11,746

15th
George H. Moore 13.372 (reelected) / Wilder W. Hartley 8,016

1949

1949 primary

1949–53 Citywide

Mayor
Fletcher Bowron 179,929 (nominated) / Lloyd Aldrich 87,766 (nominated) / Ellis Patterson 57,286 / Jack V. Tenney 48,162 / Olin E. Darby 18,806 / Shaw 2,716 / Attaway 2,647 / Weiss 1,506

1949–51 City Council

1st
Leland S. Warburton 17,073 (elected) / Lory 3,857

2nd
Lloyd G. Davies 17,179 (elected) / Barrett 3,490 / Barnes 2,505 / Smith 931

3rd
J. Win Austin 17,373 (elected) / Klenner 4,078

4th
Harold A. Henry 18,337 (elected) / Frolich 5,387

5th
George P. Cronk 14,652 (elected) / McDonough 7,050 / Major 5,637

6th
L.E. Timberlake 16,086 (elected) / Wilson 4,318 / Boyle 2,093 / Dulgarian 1,290 / Orr 1,175 / Smith 836 / Caustin 809

7th
Don A. Allen 19,906 (elected) / Bryant 4,347

8th
Kenneth Hahn 22,277 (elected) / Olson 4,002

9th
Edward R. Roybal 11,139 (nominated) / Parley Parker Christensen 9,521 / Sheehan 2,754 / Sullivan 2,637

10th
No contest.

11th
No contest.

12th
Ed J. Davenport 17,811 (elected) / Kushner 4,811

13th
No contest.

14th
John C. Holland 15,323 (elected) / Thrasher 8,237 / Meek 4,756

15th
George H. Moore 12,670 (elected) / McClung 8,307

1949 final

1949–53 Citywide

Mayor
Fletcher Bowron 238,199 (reelected) / Lloyd Aldrich 207,211

1949–51 City Council

9th
Edward R. Roybal 20,473 (elected) / Parley Parker Christensen 11,956

1951

1951 primary

1951–53 City Council

1st Leland S. Warburton 13,290 (elected) / O'Brien 12,800

2nd Earle D. Baker 13,609 (elected) / Lloyd G. Davies 7,835 / Brady 3,718

3rd J. Win Austin 18,942 (elected) / Klenner 4,585

4th Harold A. Henry 17,005 (elected) / Melham 4,671

5th George P. Cronk 15,505 (elected) / Case 4,112 / E. Snapper Ingram 3,803

6th L.E. Timberlake 19,753 (elected) / Holzhausen 4,419

7th Don A. Allen 14,752 (elected)

8th Kenneth Hahn 15,277 (reelected)

9th Edward R. Roybal 17,941 (elected) / Rael 5,762

10th Kilpatrick 5,301 (nominated) / Charles Navarro 5,077 (nominated) / G. Vernon Bennett 3,835 / Hubbard 2,250 / Charles E. Downs 1,423

11th Harold Harby 12,728 (elected) / Hill 10,960

12th Ed J. Davenport 10,386 (elected) / Newton 5,019 / Payne 2,419 / McFarland 1,030

13th Ernest E. Debs 15,804 (elected) / Monroe 7,505 / Balmer 1,670

14th John C. Holland 13,809 (elected) / Garrick 9,461 / Hop 1,902 / Welchel 654

15th George H. Moore 7,541 (nominated) / John S. Gibson Jr. 6,852 (nominated) / Hillyer Jr. 3,988

1951 final

1951–53 City Council

10th Charles Navarro 9.075 (elected) / Kilpatrick 7,382

15th John S. Gibson Jr. 10,555 (elected) / George H. Moore 9,514

1953

1953 primary

1953–57 citywide

Mayor Norris Poulson 211,247 (nominated) / Fletcher Bowron 178,362 / Aldrich 70,459 / Burke 16,470 / Weiss 3,542

City attorney Roger Arnebergh 280,195 (reelected) / Patterson 120,442 / Erwin 35,876

Controller Daniel O. Hoye 317,526 (reelected) / Chenoweth 73,734

1953–57 City Council
Four-year terms for City Council members begin.

1st Everett G. Burkhalter 14,968 (nominated) / O'Brien (nominated) 10,583 / Garver 3,698 / Taylor 930

2nd Earle D. Baker 24,257 (reelected) / O'Connor Jr. 4,665 / West 2,688

3rd Robert M. Wilkinson 5,803 (nominated) / O'Rourke 5,129 (nominated) / Plugge 4,140 / and 13 others

4th Harold A. Henry 21,925 (reelected) / Schulman 4,195 / Long 4,018

5th Rosalind Wiener 9,712 (nominated) / Elmer Marshrey 9,261 (nominated) / Nash 4,715 / and six others

6th L.E. Timberlake 16,876 (reelected) / Thruelson 12,504 / Behling 1,943

7th Don A. Allen 18,965 (reelected) / Smith 12,504 / Noeller 1,731

8th Gordon Hahn 13,940 (elected) / Sorensen 5,296 / Rev. E. W. Rakestraw 3,352 / and five others

9th Edward R. Roybal unopposed (reelected)

10th Charles Navarro 14,892 (reelected) / Dr. John A. Somerville 8,316 / Hayes 2,781 / and two others

11th Harold Harby 16,840 (reelected) / Hill 9,996 / Eckman 1,359 / and two others

12th Ed J. Davenport 14,025 (reelected) / Ransom M. Callicott 13,582

13th Ernest E. Debs 26,323 (reelected) / Mirabal 2,581 / McDonald 1,931

14th John C. Holland 16,783 (reelected) / Garrick 13,349 / Sinclair 2,195

15th John S. Gibson, Jr. 16,896 (reelected) / Love 5,003 / and 2 others

1953 final

1953–57 citywide

Mayor Norris Poulson 287,619 (elected) / Fletcher Bowron 252,721

1953–57 City Council

1st Everett G. Burkhalter 21,646 / O'Brien 13,919

3rd Robert M. Wilkinson 20,661 / O'Rourke 17,315

5th Rosalind Wiener 21,110 / Elmer Marshrey 18,790

1955

1955 primary

1955–59 City Council

2nd Earle D. Baker 17,478 (elected) / Fanning 9,689 / Bernhard 1,385 / Bassett 943

4th Harold A. Henry 16,790 (elected) / Schulman 4,934 / Bartlett 2,534

6th L.E. Timberlake 21,409 (elected) / Rose 2,590 / Serias 2,103

8th Gordon Hahn 13,974 (elected) / Givens 3,507 / Parks 3,185

10th Charles Navarro 11,336 (elected) / Thomas 6,236 / Lomax 3,086 / Mackaig 1.555 / Whitworth 477

12th Ransom M. Callicott 12,237 (elected) / Gummerman? 3,341? / Ketchum 2,013 / Abbott 1,858 / Borovay 723

14th John C. Holland 14,012 (elected) / Woodward 11,532?

1955 final 

There were no runoff races in city elections.

1957

1957 primary

1957–61 citywide

Mayor Norris Poulson 311,970 (elected) / Yeakel 141,306 / Ennis 44,112 / Carpenter 8,609 / Banks 7,094

1957–61 City Council

1st Everett G. Burkhalter 29,704 (elected) / Ames 6,209 / Brodnax 1,681

3rd Patrick D. McGee 18,648 (elected) / Maguire 6,437 / Brouillette 6,318 / Violette 1,531 / King 1,046 / Miller 1,011 / Ross 630 / Fixler 599

5th Rosalind Wiener Wyman 32,468 (elected) / Knoble 3,435 / Leeds 2,545 / Wolin 1,278

7th James C. Corman 7,209 (nominated) / Kay Bogendorfer 6,729 (nominated) / Ernani Bernardi 4,791 / Pulskamp 4,292 / Nadeau 2,952 / Plugge 2,778 / Connolly 2,071 / Alton 1,968 / Whitney 1,099 / Bongfeldt 1,027

9th No contest

11th Karl L. Rundberg 12,084 (nominated) / Harold Harby (nominated) 9,091 / Raeburn 6,230 / Gottlieb 4,752 / Ryerson 872

13th No contest

15th No contest

1957 final

1957–61 City Council

7th  James C. Corman 18,916 (elected) / Kay Bogendorfer 11,544

11th Karl L. Rundberg 17,524 (elected) / Harold Harby 10,193

1959

1959 primary

1959–63 City Council

2nd Lemoine Blanchard 12,814 (nominated) / Earle D. Baker 10,706 (nominated) / McCann 2,602 / Walt Emeson 2,295

4th Harold A. Henry 20,680 (reelected) / Eaton 6,058 / Hersh 1,216

6th L.E. Timberlake 17,376 (reelected) / Davenport 4,496 / Serfas? 3,401

8th Gordon Hahn 16,819 (reelected) / Tolbert 3,516 / Harper 2,064 / Fike 894

10th Charles Navarro 12,961 (reelected) / Atkinson 7,628 / Allen 5,454 / Burke 2,696 / Gray 831

12th Ransom Callicott 12,740 (reelected) / Russell 6,520

13th (unexpired term of Ernest E. Debs) James Harvey Brown 7,864 (nominated) / Charles Bigler 4,005 (nominated) / Perino? 2,345 / Perkins? 2,238 / Runyan? 2,060 / Christopherson 1,970 / Pontino? 1,942 / Bearlay? 1,026 / Feingold? 540

14th John C. Holland 15,959 (reelected) /  Basden? 6,592 / Bodine? 3,852 / Broglia? 831 / Beal? 641 / Gledding? 287 / Runyon? 261 / Carson? 254

1959 final

1959–63 City Council

2nd Lemoine Blanchard 16,195 (elected) / Earle D. Baker 13,178

10th Charles Navarro 17,861 (reelected) / Atkinson 15,121

13th (unexpired term of Ernest E. Debs) James Harvey Brown 13,981 (elected) / Charles Bigler 10,609

1961

1961 primary

1961–65 citywide

Mayor Norris Poulson 179,273 (nominated) / Sam Yorty 122,475 (nominated) / Patrick D. McGee 115,635 / Ronstadt 11,340 / Kessler 7,558 / Carpenter 7,267 / Miller 4,640 / Coover 2,141 / Lauria 1,598

City attorney Roger Arnebergh 299,411 (reelected) / Garrett 108,143

City controller Charles Navarro 187,122 (nominated) / Daniel O. Hoye 133,569 (nominated) / Fischer 65,318 / Kay 25,683

1961–65 City Council

1st Everett G. Burkhalter 17,284 (reelected) / Simmons 7,855 / Quevedo 2,499 / Hirsch 2,288

3rd Thomas D. Shepard 11,532 (nominated) / Moffatt 7,449 (nominated) / Moss 4,282 / Anderson 2,258 / Hiscock 1,024 / Ellis 1,797 / Curran 1,295 / Clifton 1,271 / Lamm 1,241 / Van Arsdale 1,047 / Bergin 998 / Criz 943 / Wick 605 / Crosson 550 / Vance 333

5th Rosalind Wiener Wyman 22,702 (reelected) / Ben-Tovim 5,816 / Stewart 3,767 / Solin 2,624

7th Ernani Bernardi 11,811 (nominated) / Hardy 5,040 (nominated) / Contino 4,444 / Harrison 3,244 / Winters 2,291 / Sitler 1,896 / McDonald 1,534 / Rosenberg 1,397 / Taylor 901 / Kliebert 546 / Milliner 511 / Wapner 436

9th Edward R. Roybal 17,291 (reelected) / Carter 2,777 / Ruiz 1,784

11th Karl L. Rundberg 20,521 (reelected) / Davis 6,760 / Gallagher 3,733

13th James Harvey Brown 21,951 (reelected) / Libow 5,430 / Abel 1,904 / Berset 1,694

15th John S. Gibson, Jr. 19,928 (reelected)

1961 final

1961–65 citywide

Mayor Samuel Yorty 273,073 (elected) / Norris Poulson 257,073

City controller Charles Navarro 331,340 (elected) / Dan O. Hoye 161,690

1961–65 City Council

3rd Thomas D. Shepard 28,902 (elected) / Norbert B. Moffat 18,508

7th Ernani Bernardi 22,291 (elected) / J. Howard Hardy 18,825

1963

1963 primary

1963–67 City Council

1st Phill Silver 6,503 (nominated) / Louis R. Nowell 4,068 (nominated) / Foote 3,000 / Simmons 2,856 / Hamner 2,764 / Dodd 2,528 / Corrigan 1,948 / Lipton 1,939 / Imus 1,503 / DiFrancesco 705 / Rick 648 / Weeks 325

2nd C. Lemoine Blanchard 13,758 (nominated) / James B. Potter, Jr. 8,480 (nominated) / Feiner 7,119 / Michaels 2,251 / Walt Emeson 1,783 / Malone 638 / Hawthorne 348

4th Harold A. Henry 20,793 (reelected) / O'Connor 4,696 / Kruger 1,388

6th L.E. Timberlake 14,818 (reelected) / Burke 10,635

8th Billy G. Mills 11,114 (nominated) / Leon Harrison 5,717 (nominated) / Porter 4,698 / Loyd 3,956 / Burton Jr. 1,297

9th Gilbert W. Lindsay 11,631 (nominated) / Richard Tafoya 9,096 (nominated) / Hinkle 1,741 / Sanchez 1,559 / Serrato 620 / Valencia 284

10th unexpired term ending June 30, 1963 Tom Bradley 17,760 (elected) / Joe E. Hollingsworth 10,540

10th full term starting July 1, 1963 Tom Bradley 17,552 (elected) / Joe E. Hollingsworth 10,400

12th John P. Cassidy 12,788 (elected) / McDermott 4,339 / Jong 1,607 / Soles 1,220

14th John C. Holland 16,140 (elected) / Hobart 9,921 / Mackey 2,419

1963 final

1st Louis R. Nowell 4,068 (reelected) / Phill Silver 12,847

2nd James B. Potter, Jr. 18,971 (elected) / C. Lemoine Blanchard 17,117

8th Billy G. Mills 16,389 (elected) / Leon Harrison 8,927

9th Gilbert W. Lindsay 16,440 (reelected) / Richard Tafoya 13,109

1965

1965 primary

1965–69 citywide

Mayor Samuel W. Yorty 392,776 (elected) / James Roosevelt 247,313 / Ware 1,728 / Bolger 1,446 / Chrisoheris 915 / Hawthorne 696 / Coover 491

City attorney Roger Arnebergh 474,550 (elected)

City controller Charles Navarro 470,324 (elected)

1965–69 City Council

1st Louis R. Nowell 27,574 (elected) / Skowron 7,260

3rd Thomas D. Shepard 27,483 (elected) / Morris 12,840 / Slocum 1,764

5th Rosalind Wiener Wyman 14,198 (nominated) / Edmund D. Edelman 12,988 (nominated) / Teichner 10,153 / Halper 8,703 / Biren 4,958 / French 2,455 / Lertzman 320

7th Ernani Bernardi 22,268 (reelected) / McIntyre 7,840 / Brown 4,417 / Carasso 1,822 / Simmons 1,228 / Frailich 595

9th Gilbert W. Lindsay 25,477 (elected) / Calderon 10,662 / Valencia 2,606 / Brooks 1,145

11th Karl L. Rundberg 22,397 (nominated) / Marvin Braude 11,033 (nominated) / Rogers 8,671 / Eells 4,103

13th unexpired term ending June 30, 1965 Paul H. Lamport 13,554 (nominated) / Mary Tinglof 10,534 (nominated) / Libow 5,518 / Marvin 3,906 / Fenstermaker 2,427 / Pedroza 2,081 / Passow 2,059 / Nathanson 1,463

13th full term starting July 1, 1965 Paul H. Lamport 13,031 /  Mary Tinglof 9,913 (nominated) / Libow 5,208 / Marvin 3,735 / Fenstermaker 2,224 / Passow 1,832 / Pedrosa  1,752 / Nathanson 1,365 / Sullivan 656 / Angier 414 / Rivas 347 / Sellers 292 / Berset 90

15th John S. Gibson, Jr. 24,209 (reelected) / Aguirre 8,962

1965 final

1965–69 City Council

5th Edmund D. Edelman 37,291 (elected) / Rosalind Wiener Wyman 12,201

11th Marvin Braude 22,023 (elected) / Karl L. Rundberg 18,976

13th unexpired term ending June 30, 1965 Paul H. Lamport 21,675 (elected / Mary Tinglof 13,160

13th full term starting July 1, 1965 Paul H. Lamport 21,269 (elected) /  Mary Tinglof 13,160

1967

1967 primary

1967–71 City Council

2nd James B. Potter, Jr. 14,868 (elected) / Walt Emeson 2,901 / Boyd 1,949 / Rick 1,369

4th unexpired term John Ferraro 20,024 (elected) / Bourland 7,605

4th full term John Ferraro 19,612 (reelected) / Bourland 7,581

6th L.E. Timberlake 16,928 (reelected) / Killmeyer 2,198 / Carter 2,109 / O'Brien 1,206 / Peters 931

8th Billy G. Mills 21,650 (reelected) / Williams 892 / Burchett 850 / Green 829

10th Tom Bradley unopposed.

12th Robert M. Wilkinson 8,982 (nominated) / John P. Cassidy 6,112  (nominated) / Cavnar 3,281 / Contino 2,844 / Jones 2,729 / Waisgerber 1,859 / Marrone 1,041 / Markham 603

14th Arthur K. Snyder 15,157 (elected) / Cook 4,014 / Wong 3,866 / Mackey 3,731 / Jacinto 1,168 / O'Neill 834 / George 646 / Orr 380 / Lockwood 360 / Hampton 135

1967 final

1967–71 City Council
12th Robert M. Wilkinson 24,312 (elected) / John P. Cassidy 7,127

1969

1969 primary

1969–73 citywide

Mayor Tom Bradley 293,793 (nominated) / Sam Yorty 183,334 (nominated) / Baxter Ward 116,555 / Bell 99,172 / Robert M. Wilkinson 2,682 / Steinberg 1,574 / Andreson 1,600 / Elliott 1,160 / Rourke 790 / Kline 718 / Whizin 659 / Hathaway 375 / Federick 277 / Schulner 169

City attorney Roger Arnebergh 384,355 (reelected)

City controller Charles Navarro 379.971 (reelected)

1969–73 City Council

1st Louis R. Nowell 22,818 (reelected) / Jim Keysor 7,890 / Cortes 6,111 / Wahrman 3,958 / Wargo 1,099

3rd Howard W. Speer 13,778 (nominated) / Donald Lorenzen 9,519 (nominated) / Moffatt 5,159 / Walker 4,452 / Ames 3,597 / Moore 3,074 / New 2,813 / Falcone 1,551 / Smith 866

5th Edmund D. Edelman 42,358 (reelected) / Rutledge 4,453 / Dans 2,550

7th Ernani Bernardi 29,120 (reelected) / Onan 9,509 / Marrone 3,323

9th Gilbert W. Lindsay 26,274 (reelected)

11th Marvin Braude 35,962 (reelected)

13th Paul H. Lamport 13,955 (nominated) / Robert Stevenson 11,037 (nominated) / Pedroza 7,034 / Norman 2,951 / Scherb 2,309 / Newman 2,289 / Lemieux 1,084

15th John S. Gibson, Jr. 25,676 (reelected)

1969 final

1969–73 citywide

Mayor Sam Yorty 447,030 (reelected) / Tom Bradley 392,379

1969–73 City Council

3rd Donald Lorenzen 32,387 (elected) / Howard W. Speer 23,888

13th Robert Stevenson 26,335 (elected) / Paul H. Lamport 22,935

1969 special
First special election in history of Los Angeles.

1969–71 City Council

6th Pat Russell won by 520 votes over her closest opponent, Frank Small. There were three other candidates.

1971

1971 primary

1971–75 City Council

2nd Joel Wachs 6,346 (nominated) / James B. Potter, Jr. 6,016 (nominated) / Melograno 4,104 / Smith 3,718 / Commons 3,598 / Bennett 2,827 / Wieder 2,172 / Stanley Hirsh 606 / Rick 648 / Williams 572 /  Walt Emeson 486 / Arthur Arthur 354 / True Slocum 207 / Eileen Nora Andreson 197 / Duberchin 126

4th John Ferraro 18,892 (reelected) / Federick 3,540

6th unexpired term of L.E. Timberlake Pat Russell 15,612 (reelected) / Small 11,040

6th Pat Russell 15,207 (reelected) / Frank Small 11,214

8th Billy G. Mills 18,778 (reelected)

10th Tom Bradley 19,164 (reelected) / Henry 2,835

12th Robert M. Wilkinson 15,301 (reelected) / Waisgerber 4,221 / Holtz 2,835 / Christensen 2,608 / Boudreau 1,176

14th  Arthur K. Snyder 21,500 (reelected) / Deal 5,261 / Perez 4,214

1971 final

1971–75 City Council

2nd Joel Wachs 24,704 (elected) / James B. Potter, Jr. 14,898

1973

1973 primary

1973–77 citywide

Mayor Tom Bradley 233,789 (nominated) / Sam Yorty 190,649 (nominated) / Jess Unruh 114,693 / Reddin 83,930 / Joel Wachs 24,907 / Dornan 4,849 / Rodriguez 2,326 / Bagley 2,118 / Anderson 1,037 / Watson 792 / Buchanan 685 / Orr 555 / Ware 371

City attorney Roger Arnebergh 249,750 (nominated) / Burt Pines 211,260 (nominated) / Ira Reiner 46,599 / Hyman 23,604

City controller Charles Navarro 356,245 (reelected) / Gold 81,253 / Hoag 41,613 / Day 33,323 / Blount 31,837 / Taylor 20,505 / Rees 13,929

1973–77 City Council

1st Louis R. Nowell 17,058 (reelected) / Howard Finn 6,395 / Rodney G. Harrison 3,229 / Dib 2,215 / Willis 1,674 / Hamlin 1,514

3rd Donald D. Lorenzen 18,886 (nominated) / Joy Picus 10,087 / Scola 8,602 / Dominguez 3,323 / Bach 3,150

5th Edmund D. Edelman 42,179 (reelected)

7th Ernani Bernardi, 29,308 (reelected)

9th Gilbert W. Lindsay 16,848 (reelected) / Hinkle 3,683 / Kelley 2,736 / Scott 2,075 / Stanley 1,959 / Barnett 1,693

10th David S. Cunningham, Jr. (elected) / George Takei

11th Marvin Braude 43,901 (reelected) / Falcone 5,269 / Henry 4,891 (One precinct missing)

13th  Robert Stevenson 12,905 (nominated) / Kasper 11,313 / Paul H. Lamport 4,922 / Estomo 3,879 / Perez 2,562 / Newman 1,750 / Machadah 1,534 / Discola 1,461

15th John S. Gibson, Jr. 16,789 (reelected) / Almeida 5,659 / Siegfried 2,768

1973 final

1973–77 citywide

Mayor Tom Bradley 431,222 (elected) / Sam Yorty 334,297

City attorney Burt Pines 418, 856 (elected) / Roger Arnebergh 299,212

1973–77 City Council

3rd Don Lorenzen 27, 575 (reelected) / Joy Picus 27,027 (totals as determined by a recount)

13th Robert Stevenson 27,231 (reelected) / Kasper 21,062

1975

1975 primary

1975–79 City Council

2nd Joel Wachs 1,321 (reelected) / Bell 97 / Rickless 94 / Kritt 55 / Gabriel 21

4th John Ferraro 6,275 (reelected) / Ogren 1,575 / Abella 832 / Broy 193

5th Fran Savitch 2,433 (nominated) / Zev Yaroslavsky 1,635 (nominated) / Rosalind Wiener Wyman 1,523 / Pye 846 / Rutledge 339 / Richman 313 / French 219 / Hamm 132 / Cowan 103 / Milrad 82

6th Pat Russell 1,351 (reelected) / Overfelt 425 / Lee 157 / Nickel 40

8th unexpired term of Billy G. Mills Robert C. Farrell 4,879 (elected)

8th full term Robert C. Farrell 3,873 (elected) / Curtis 809 / Justice 524

10th unexpired term of Tom Bradley David S. Cunningham, Jr. 4,884 (elected)

10th full term David S. Cunningham, Jr. 3,571 (elected) / Bradley 1,621 / MacMillan 648

12th Robert M. Wilkinson 1,613 (nominated) / Klein 1,306 (nominated) / Gallagher 482 / Dantona 343 / Goetzman 88

14th  Arthur K. Snyder 5,161 (elected) / Lopez-Lee 2,957 / Avila 1,914 / Garcia 791 / Armas 225 / Bastides 144 / Pendas 30

1975 final

1975–79 City Council

5th unexpired term of Edmund D. Edelman Zev Yaroslavsky 23,372 (elected) / Fran Savitch 19,606

12th Robert M. Wilkinson 20,391 (elected) / Klein 20,058

13th Peggy Stevenson 9,008 (elected) / Irving Kasper 6,900 / Quinn 5,342 / plus 26 other candidates

1977

1977 primary

1977–81 Citywide

Mayor Tom Bradley 287,927 (reelected) / Robbins 136,180 / Jarvis 47,665 / plus nine other candidates

City attorney Burt Pines 366,398 (reelected) / Clancy 35,324 / Diamond 19,929 / plus two other candidates

City controller Ira Reiner 185,328 (nominated) / Robert C. Cline 82,153 (nominated) / Louis R. Nowell 38,959 / plus seven other candidates

1977–81 City Council

1st Bob Ronka 9,201 (nominated) / Jim Peterson 5,098 (nominated) / Howard Finn 3,406 / plus eleven other candidates

3rd Joy Picus 17,465 (nominated) / Donald D. Lorenzen 15,722 (nominated) / Moore 3,565 / plus three other candidates

5th Zev Yaroslavsky 39,034 (reelected) / Milrad 3,613

7th Ernani Bernardi 22,205 (reelected) / Unjian 8,212

9th Gilbert W. Lindsay 19,696 (reelected) / Hinkle 2,201 / plus four other candidates

11th Marvin Braude 28,416 (reelected) / Pye 10,114 / Crossley 5,534 (One precinct missing)

13th Peggy Stevenson 24,929 (reelected)

15th John S. Gibson, Jr. 10,269 (nominated) / Stanbery 4,335 (nominated) / Pescetti 2,559 / plus two other candidates

1977 final

1977–81 citywide

City controller Ira Reiner 195,552 (elected) / 123,929

1977–81 City Council

1st Bob Ronka 12.333 (elected) / Jim Peterson 7,684

3rd Joy Picus 19,598 (elected) / Donald D. Lorenzen 14,456

15th John S. Gibson, Jr. 12.861 (reelected) / Stanbery 6.866

1979

1979 primary

1979–83 City Council
Full returns unavailable.

2nd Joel Wachs (elected) / Joseph J. Micciche / Morton J. Allen

4th John Ferraro (elected with 84%)

6th Pat Russell 7,659 (elected) / Frank Overfelt 3,587 / plus three other candidates

8th Robert Farrell (elected with 77%)

10th David S. Cunningham, Jr. 9,116 (elected) / Nate Holden 7,505

12th Barbara Klein 7,129 (nominated) / Hal Bernson 6,700 (nominated) / plus fourteen other candidates

14th Arthur K. Snyder (elected) / unopposed

1979 final

1979–83 City Council

12th Hal Bernson 24,825 (elected) / Barbara Klein 12,415

1981

1981 primary

A few precincts missing.

1981–85 Citywide

Mayor Tom Bradley 279,501 (elected) / Sam Yorty 142,204 / Fischer 2,344 / plus sixteen others

City attorney Ira Reiner 216,366 (nominated) / Bob Ronka 137,254 (nominated) / Zinger 73,714 / Drabin 7,770

City controller James Hahn 164,937 (nominated) / Weeks 75,146 (nominated) / Travis 61,500 / plus five other candidates

1981–85 City Council

1st Jim Keysor 8,214 (nominated) / Howard Finn 4,801 (nominated) / Hayes 3,451 / plus six other candidates

3rd Joy Picus 21,241 (reelected) / Vanderbok 10,543

5th Zev Yaroslavsky 34,651 (reelected) / Unopposed

7th Ernani Bernardi 22,320 (reelected) / Goldener 5,245 / Mulman 1,878

9th Gilbert W. Lindsay 18,510 (reelected) / Barnett 1,453 / Hinkle 1,320 / Bates 878

11th Marvin Braude 27,469 (reelected) / Stout 6,230 / plus three other candidates

13th Peggy Stevenson 12,145 (nominated) / Michael Woo 11,770 (nominated) / Amador 2,049 / White 1,911

15th Joan Milke Flores 8,046 (nominated) / Greenwood 4,786 (nominated) / Stanbery 2,005 / plus nine others

1981 final

1981–85 citywide

City attorney Ira Reiner 231,540 (elected) / Bob Ronka 133,205

City controller James Hahn 194,226 (elected) / Weeks 162,619

1981–85 City Council

1st Howard Finn 12,847 (elected) / Jim Keysor 11,151

13th Peggy Stevenson 20,162 (reelected) / Michael Woo 13,018

15th Joan Milke Flores 10,205 (elected) / Greenwood 9,943

1983

1983 primary

1983–7 City Council

2nd Joel Wachs 17,518 (reelected) / Hays 2,219 / Paterson 1,322 / plus three others

4th John Ferraro 12,705 (reelected) / Ghandi 1,016 / Garza 907

6th Pat Russell 14,390 (reelected) / Simpson 6,423 / Stowe 3,290

8th Robert C. Farrell 12,791 (reelected) / Hale 2,780 / Walton-James 1,479 / plus two others

10th David S. Cunningham, Jr. 13,406 (reelected) / Wertz 2,084

12th Hal Bernson 15,647 (reelected) / Sherman 8,704

14th  Art Snyder 10,497 (reelected) / Rodriguez 8,952 / Schaefer 643 / plus three others

1983 final
No final. All incumbents were reelected in the primary.

1985

1985 primary

1985–89 citywide

Mayor Tom Bradley 220,055 (reelected) / John Ferraro 98,163 / Eileen Anderson 1,293 / and six others

City attorney James Kenneth Hahn 167,797 (elected) / Lisa Specht 130,843 / Murray Kane 9,429 / plus two others

City controller Dan Shapiro 99,677 (nominated) / Rick Tuttle 86,939 (nominated) / Alice Travis 65,032 / Celes King III 28,003

1985–89 City Council

1st Howard Finn 12,398 (reelected) / Elton Michael 3,170 / Noel S. Horwin 1,869 / Louis Cichelli 341

3rd Joy Picus 15,513 (reelected) / Jeanne Nemo 5,525 / Matt Lynch 3,195 / plus three others

5th Zev Yaroslavsky 24,597 (reelected) / Unopposed

7th Ernani Bernardi 13,602 (reelected) / Pat Goldener 1,057 / Marty Israel 900

9th Gilbert W. Lindsay 16,086 (reelected) / Donald L. Barnett 2,814

11th Marvin Braude 23,392 (reelected) / Unopposed

13th Peggy Stevenson 8,690 (nominated) / Mike Woo 7,188 (nominated) / Michael Linfield 2,791 / plus three others

15th Joan Milke Flores 17,044 (reelected) / Unopposed

1985 final

1985–89 citywide

Controller Rick Tuttle 146,077 (elected) / Dan Shapiro 124,966

1985–89 City Council

13th Mike Woo 16,417 (elected) / Peggy Stevenson

1985 special

1985–89 City Council

14th Richard Alatorre 11,928 (elected) / Steve Rodriguez, 3,199 / Gilbert Avila 2,376 / and four others

1987

1987 primary

1987–91 City Council

2nd Joel Wachs 9,327 (reelected) / Jerry Allan Hays 4,214 / Georgetta Wilmuth 431 / Jack E. Davis 399

4th John Ferraro 10,775 (reelected) / Sal Genovese 2,391

6th Pat Russell 10,697 (nominated) / Ruth Galanter 7,435 (nominated) / Patrick McCartney 4,245 / plus three others

8th Robert C. Farrell 8,347 (reelected) / Tony Parent 3,013 / plus four others

10th Nate Holden 4,366 (nominated) / Homer Broome, Jr. 3,257 (nominated) / Myrilie Evers 2,601 plus ten others

12th Hal Bernson 11,763 (reelected) / Richard K. Williams II 2,963

14th  Richard Alatorre 6,626 (reelected) / Rex Guttierez 3,188 / Loren Leonard Lutz 1,213

1987 final

1987–91 City Council

6th Ruth Galanter 21,846 (elected) / Pat Russell 15,855

10th Nate Holden 10,594 (elected) / Home Broome, Jr. 5,490

1989

1989 primary
Not available

1989–93 citywide
Not available.

1989–93 City Council
Not available.

1989 final

1989–93 City Council

7th Ernani Bernardi 8,826 (elected) / Lyle Hall 7,168

1991

1991 primary

1991–95 City Council

4th John Ferraro 10,115 (reelected) / Unopposed

6th Ruth Galanter 11,904 (nominated) / Mary Lee Gray (nominated) 4,929 / Salvatore Grammatico 3,746 / Tavis Smiley 2,189 / and three others

10th Nate Holden 9,255 (elected) / Esther M. Lofton 3,602

1991 final

1991–95 City Council

1st Mike Hernandez 3,362 (nominated) / Sharon Mee Yung Lowe 1,726 (nominated) / Sandra L. Figueroa 1,408 / and three others

6th Ruth Galanter 18,153 (reelected) / Mary Lee Gray 7,998

8th Mark Ridley-Thomas 8,595 (elected) / Roderick Wright 8,173

9th Rita D, Walters 6,251 (elected) / Bob Gay 6,175

12th Hal Bernson 17,705 (reelected) / Julianna Korenstein 16,844

1993

1993 primary
Not available.

1993 final

1993–97 citywide

Mayor Richard J. Riordan 302,786 (elected) / Michael Woo 259,820

1993–97 City Council

3rd Laura Newman Chick 29,092 (elected) / Joy Picus 20,619

7th Richard Anthony Alarcon 9,057 (elected) / Lyle E. Hall 8,893

13th Jackie Goldberg 11,753 (elected) / Tom LaBonge 11,073

15th Rudy Svorinich 14,011 (elected) / Joan Milke Flores 14,011

1995

1995 primary
Not available.

1995 final
Not available.

1997

1997 primary

1997–2001 citywide

Mayor Richard J. Riordan 250,771 (reelected) / Tom Hayden 140,648 / Leonard Shapiro 5,454 / plus two others

City attorney James Kenneth Hahn 238,313 (elected) / Ted Stein 146,651

City controller Rick Tuttle 259,016 (reelected) / Virginia Garza 66,178 / Michael D. Margolin 39,768

1997–2001 City Council

1st Mike Hernandez 7,543 (reelected) / Rose Marie Lopez 5,313

3rd Laura Chick 28,564 (reelected) / Mort Diamond 6,581

5th Mike Feuer 35,683 (reelected) / Unopposed

7th Richard Alarcon 12,460 (reelected) / Ollie McCauley (write-in) 196

9th Gilbert W. Lindsay 18,510 (reelected) / Barnett 1,453 / Hinkle 1,320 / Bates 878

11th Georgia Mercer 17,423 (nominated) / Cindy Miscikowski (nominated) 16,530 / Mark Isler 5,537 / Doug Friedman 2,898

13th Jackie Goldberg 13,823 (reelected) / Unopposed

15th Rudy Svorinich, Jr. 13,741 / Diana Ellizabeth Contreras 6,375 / Dennis Kortheuer 2,510

1997 final

1997–2001 City Council

11th Cindy Miscikowski 13,755 (elected) / Georgia Mercer 12,321

1999–2009

Election returns from the city archives

2011

2011 primary

2011–15 City Council

2nd Paul Krekorian 12,692 (reelected) / Augusto Bisani 4,109

4th Tom Labonge 10,629 (reelected) / Tomås O'Grady 6,088 / Stephen Box 2,778

6th Tony Cardenas 4,788 (reelected) / Rich Goodman 1,539 / James (Jamie) Cordaro 1,238 / David Barron 734

8th Bernard C. Parks 9,482 (reelected) / Forescee Hogan-Rowles 8,058 / Jabari S. Jumaane 975

10th Herb J. Wesson, Jr. 9,744 (reelected) / Andrew (Andy) Kim 1,480 / Althea Rae Shaw 668 / plus three others

12th Mitchell Englander 13,751 (elected) / Brad Smith 5,917 / Navraj (Singh) Singh 1,430 / plus three others

14th  José Huizar 10,945 (reelected) / Rudy Martinez 6,310

2011 final

No runoff. All candidates were elected in the primary.

Mayoral runoff races
If no candidate wins more than 50 percent of the vote in the primary election, the top two finishers meet in a runoff two months later. The table below refers to the runoff races over the years.

Note: In the 1932 recall election William G. Bonelli received 74,917 votes.
Note: The 1941 election results represent 1,750 out of 2,753 precincts reporting, but Cunningham conceded at that point

See also

 History of Los Angeles
 Los Angeles City Council
 Los Angeles City Council presidents

References

Lists of Los Angeles public officials

Municipal election returns
Elections in Los Angeles